Gotthard Kettler, Duke of Courland (also Godert, Ketteler, ; 2 February 1517 – 17 May 1587) was the last Master of the Livonian Order and the first Duke of Courland and Semigallia.

Biography
Kettler was born near Anröchte, Kreis Soest, of an old Westphalian noble family and the ninth child of the German knight Gotthard Kettler zu Melrich (mentioned 1527–1556) and his wife Sophie of Nesselrode. Gotthard's older brother Wilhelm Kettler was bishop of Münster from 1553 to 1557.

Kettler enlisted in the Livonian order around 1537 and became a knight. In 1554 Gotthard Kettler became Komtur of Dünaburg (Daugavpils), and in 1557 Komtur of Fellin (Viljandi). In 1559, during the Livonian War (1558–1582) he succeeded Wilhelm von Fürstenberg as a Master of the Teutonic Order in Livonia. When the Livonian Confederation came under increasing pressure from Ivan IV of Russia, Kettler converted to Lutheranism and secularised Semigallia and Courland. On the basis of the Treaty of Vilnius (28 November 1561), he created the Duchy of Courland and Semigallia as a vassal state of the Grand Duchy of Lithuania, which was soon merged into the Polish–Lithuanian Commonwealth.

Following the Duke's proposal in 1567, the regional assembly (landtag) decided to build 70 new churches and 8 schools in the remote areas of Duchy where many peasants still lived and died unbaptized.

He died on 17 May 1587 in Mitau (Jelgava), aged 70. His heirs ruled in Courland until 1737.

Family 

On 11 March 1566 Kettler married Anna, Duchess of Mecklenburg, daughter of Duke Albert VII of Mecklenburg-Güstrow and Princess Anna of Brandenburg.
The couple had seven children, three of whom died early. His sons Friedrich Kettler and Wilhelm Kettler succeeded him as dukes. The daughter Anna Kettler married the Lithuanian prince Albrecht Radziwiłł, the son of Mikołaj Radziwiłł Czarny, the daughter Elisabeth Kettler married the Adam Wenceslaus, Duke of Cieszyn of Duchy of Teschen.

References

Sources
 Grusemann, Hans, 1990. Die Frühgeschichte des Geschlechts Ketteler (Kettler), 12.-16. Jahrhundert. Soest.
 Schwennicke, Ditleff. Europäische Stammtafeln zur Geschichte der Europäischen Staaten (Neue Folge), Band VIII, Tafel 91 (Die Ketteler).
 Salomon Henning's Chronicle of Courland and Livonia, translated and edited by Jerry C. Smith, William Urban and Ward Jones
 
 

1517 births
1587 deaths
People from Soest (district)
German Lutherans
Converts to Protestantism
Baltic-German people
Masters of the Livonian Order
Dukes of Courland
16th-century Latvian people
Polish people of the Livonian campaign of Stephen Báthory
Burials in the Ducal Crypt of the Jelgava Palace
People of the Livonian War